

Season summary
Looking to capitalise on their successful 2006–07 campaign, Melbourne made some strong off-season signings including Costa Rican international Carlos Hernández to cover the hole left by the departure of Fred to MLS club D.C. United. Again with the league's largest crowds and a record membership of over 20,000, Melbourne were undefeated after 7 rounds but the season slipped away with some poor home performances and a mounting injury list. A late season rally gave Melbourne a hope of making the finals up to the second last round but they finished 5th, 4 points out of the finals.

Players

First team squad

Transfers
In

Out

Matches

Pre-season matches

The match against China was played over three 30-minute periods.

2007 Pre-Season Cup

2007-08 Hyundai A-League fixtures

Ladder

2008 AFC Champions League

Warm-up matches

Matches

References

2007-08
2007–08 A-League season by team